Biate is a census town in Khawzawl district  in the state of Mizoram, India. Biate town has been selected as the cleanest town in Mizoram and Northeast.

History
Biate town was started by Mizo chief Kairuma Sailo in 1900.

Demographics

As of the 2011 India census, Biate had a population of 2277. Males constitute 49.80% of the population and females 50.20%. Biate has an average literacy rate of 98.18%, higher than the national average of 74.04%; with male literacy of 97.92% and female literacy of 98.43%. 10.94% of the population is under 6 years of age.

References

Cities and towns in Serchhip district